National Road 1.11 (alternatively marked M-1.11, M1.11 and M 1.11), was a road in Serbia, connecting Batočina with Kragujevac. After the new road categorization regulation given in 2013, the route wears the name 24. The route was a national road with two traffic lanes (more in city sections).

Sections

See also 
 Roads in Serbia

References

External links 
 Official website – Roads of Serbia (Putevi Srbije)
 Official website – Corridors of Serbia (Koridori Srbije) (Serbian)

Roads in Serbia